Enneapterygius hollemani, or Holleman's triplefin, is a species of triplefin blenny in the genus Enneapterygius. It is found only on the central and southern coasts of Oman. It was described by John E. Randall in 1995 and was named in honour of the ichthyologist Wouter Holleman of the South African Institute for Aquatic Biodiversity.

References

hollemani
Taxa named by John Ernest Randall
Fish described in 1995